Lumigny-Nesles-Ormeaux is a commune in the Seine-et-Marne department in the Île-de-France region in north-central France.

The commune was created in 1973 by the fusion of three villages: Lumigny, Nesles and Ormeaux.

On the northern side is Parc des Félins, a 60-hectare captive breeding reserve for big cats, covering 25 of the world's 41 species.

Ira and Edita Morris, who set up the Hiroshima Foundation for Peace and Culture, used to live in Nesles.

Demographics
The inhabitants are called Luminiciens (in Lumigny) or Neslois (in Nesles).

See also
Communes of the Seine-et-Marne department

References

External links

Town's website 
 

Communes of Seine-et-Marne